In Greek mythology, Eidothea or Idothea (Ancient Greek: Εἰδοθέα) was the name of the following women:

Idothea, a daughter of Oceanus and possibly Tethys, thus considered to be one of the Oceanids. Together with her sisters Adrasta and Althaea (Amalthea), she was one of the nurses of young Zeus.
Eidothea, a sea goddess and daughter of Proteus, the Old Man of the Sea. She told Menelaus how to hold her father so that he could not escape. Eidothea was simply called Eido who changed her name into Theonoe. Another of her name was Eurynome.
 Eidothea, a nymph of Othreis who mothered by Eusiros (son of Poseidon) of Cerambus who was metamorphosed by the nymphs into a gnawing beetle because of his insolence. In some myths, her son was borne up into the air on wings by the nymphs escaping the flood of Deucalion.
 Eidothea or Eidothee, a Carian woman, daughter of King Eurytus and possible spouse of Miletus who bore him Byblis and Caunus.
 Eidothea, second wife of Phineus, king of Thrace. She was the sister of Cadmus and thus, maybe the daughter of Agenor, king of Tyre. Eidothea put out the eyes of her stepsons (Gerymbas and Aspondus) with the sharp shuttle in her blood-stained hands and also caused to imprisoned them.

Notes

References 

 Antoninus Liberalis, The Metamorphoses of Antoninus Liberalis translated by Francis Celoria (Routledge 1992). Online version at the Topos Text Project.
Euripides, The Complete Greek Drama, edited by Whitney J. Oates and Eugene O'Neill, Jr. in two volumes. 2. Helen, translated by Robert Potter. New York. Random House. 1938. Online version at the Perseus Digital Library.
Euripides, Euripidis Fabulae. vol. 3. Gilbert Murray. Oxford. Clarendon Press, Oxford. 1913. Greek text available at the Perseus Digital Library.
 Hyginus, Gaius Julius, Fabulae, in The Myths of Hyginus, edited and translated by Mary A. Grant, Lawrence: University of Kansas Press, 1960. Online version at ToposText.
Homer, The Iliad with an English Translation by A.T. Murray, Ph.D. in two volumes. Cambridge, MA., Harvard University Press; London, William Heinemann, Ltd. 1924. . Online version at the Perseus Digital Library.
 Homer, Homeri Opera in five volumes. Oxford, Oxford University Press. 1920. . Greek text available at the Perseus Digital Library.
Publius Ovidius Nasao, Metamorphoses translated by Brookes More (1859-1942). Boston, Cornhill Publishing Co. 1922. Online version at the Perseus Digital Library.
Publius Ovidius Naso, Metamorphoses. Hugo Magnus. Gotha (Germany). Friedr. Andr. Perthes. 1892. Latin text available at the Perseus Digital Library.
 Smith, Scott R., and Stephen M. Trzaskoma, Apollodorus' Library and Hyginus' Fabulae: Two Handbooks of Greek Mythology, Hackett Publishing, Indianapolis/Cambridge, 2007. . Google Books.
Trzaskoma, Stephen M., R. Scott Smith, and Stephen Brunet, Anthology of Classical Myth: Primary Sources in Translation, Hackett Publishing, 2004.. Google books.
West, M. L. (1983), The Orphic Poems, Clarendon Press Oxford, 1983. .

Oreads
Nymphs
Princesses in Greek mythology
Queens in Greek mythology